Qarah Tappeh (also Kara Tapa Kalan and Qara Tepe Kālan) is a fortified village in  southern Khamyab District, Jowzjan Province, Afghanistan. It has an altitude of 248 m. (816 ft.). It was a crossroads for goods between the Andkhoy - Khamyab (town) route and the Kerki - Akcha route.

See also
 Jowzjan Province

Populated places in Jowzjan Province